King's Scout can refer to several ranks in Scout organizations around the world:

King Scout, the highest rank in the National Scout Organization of Thailand
Pengakap Raja, the highest rank in the Persekutuan Pengakap Malaysia
King's Scout is the highest rank in many Commonwealth countries; termed Queen's Scout during the reign of a female monarch of the Commonwealth realms

See also
 List of highest awards in Scouting
Crown Scout  
President's Award (disambiguation)

Scout and Guide awards